Unhošť is a town in Kladno District in the Central Bohemian Region of the Czech Republic. It has about 4,800 inhabitants. The historic town centre is well preserved and is protected by law as an urban monument zone.

Geography
It lies mostly in the Křivoklát Highlands, the eastern part of the municipal territory lies in the Prague Plateau. The Černý Brook springs here and supplies a system of ponds.

History
The first written mention of Unhošť is from 1284. In 1329, it was referred to as a market town belonging to the Křivoklát estate. In 1489, King Vladislaus II granted Unhošť various privileges and thus accelerated its development. The development was interrupted by the Thirty Years' War, during which the market town was captured twice. Between 1783 and 1790, Unhošť was promoted to a town.

Demographics

Transport
The D6 motorway runs north of the town.

Sights
The Church of Saints Peter and Paul is the landmark of the historic centre and the oldest monument in the town. Originally a Gothic building, it was built in the 14th century and first documented in 1329. At the beginning of the 18th century, the church was rebuilt into its current Baroque form.

Notable people
František Plesnivý (1845–1918), architect
Karel Wellner (1875–1926), painter and illustrator
František Pospíšil (born 1944), ice hockey player and coach
Barbora Špotáková (born 1981), javelin thrower, Olympic winner; lives here

References

External links

Cities and towns in the Czech Republic
Populated places in Kladno District